The 2014 Maltese Super Cup was the 32nd Maltese Super Cup, an annual football match played between the winners of the previous season's Maltese Premier League and the FA Trophy. The game was played between Valletta, champions of the 2013–14 Maltese Premier League, and Birkirkara, who beat Hibernians in the final of the 2014–15 FA Trophy. Played at Ta' Qali National Stadium, Birkirkara won the match 2–1.

Match

Details

See also 
 2014–15 Maltese Premier League
 2014–15 Maltese FA Trophy

References 

1
2014–15 in European football
2014 in association football
Maltese Super Cup